Fred, Frederic, or Frederick Barnes may refer to:
Fred Barnes (baseball), Negro league baseball player
Fred Barnes (footballer) (1921–1996), Australian rules footballer
Fred Barnes (journalist) (born 1943), American journalist and political commentator
Fred Barnes (performer) (1885–1938), English music hall artist
Fred J. Barnes (1873–1917), British songwriter
Frederic Gorell Barnes, British politician
Frederick Barnes (architect) (1814–1898), British architect who worked in East Anglia
Frederick Barnes (RAAF officer) (1924–2018), Australian pilot and senior Royal Australian Air Force officer